Sègre-Ter  was a department of France created in Spain on 7 March 1813 by merging the departments of Sègre and Ter. This merger was established by decree but never published in the Bulletin des lois, leaving its judicial status uncertain. The department was officially suppressed on 10 March 1814.

External links 
  Espagne (histoire-empire.org)

Former departments of France in Spain
1813 establishments in the First French Empire